The BBC Two '1991–2001' idents were broadcast from 16 February 1991 until 19 November 2001, and again from 9 July 2014 until 26 September 2018, on BBC Two in the United Kingdom. The idents, which consisted of a sans-serif '2' in Gill Sans, accompanied by the colour viridian, were created by branding agency Lambie-Nairn (and later, Red Bee Media), who also created the Channel 4 logo.

The ident package was retained following the corporate rebrand of the BBC in October 1997 when a new logo and additional idents were introduced. The idents were taken out of service in November 2001, and were later revived on 21 June 2014 for "90s Night" and in July 2014, to commemorate the 50th birthday of BBC Two. They replaced the "Window on the World" idents and were broadcast until the evening of Wednesday 26 September 2018.

Conception
The newly recruited BBC2 controller, Alan Yentob, noticed that the then-logo for the channel, which featured the word 'TWO' in red, green and blue within a white background and the 'O' being white, was affecting the reputation of BBC2. Surveys commissioned realised that most viewers thought the branding was "dull but worthy". He then decided to commission a worthy successor capable of displaying the personality of the channel, revealing his thoughts in the How Do They Do That? episode - about the idents.

The idents were designed by the late branding expert Martin Lambie-Nairn, and first aired on the same day as the BBC1 virtual globe ident, also designed by Lambie-Nairn as part of a corporate rebrand of both channels.

Idents
The idents featured a sans-serif '2' in a variety of different forms and environments usually accompanied by an element of the colour viridian and accompanied by a static corporate logo DOG below the '2'. Another DOG often used with the look was a small '888' legend in the top right of the screen. This meant that subtitles were available to accompany the programme on Ceefax page 888. Following the 1997 rebrand, the BBC logo was changed, with the word TWO added after the logo at the bottom of the screen. The '888' legend was also phased out in July 1999, to be replaced with 'Subtitles' following the uptake in digital television and the increased use of the new BBC Text service. A section of the TV programme How Do They Do That? that was broadcast on 15 February 1995 described how the graphics and sound of some of the idents were created.

The clock idents had been changed through years and were mainly used for closedowns and news. The first clock ident was used in February until late 1991, the second was used in late 1991 until October 1997. The clock was edited in October 1997 with the new logo. This was the last BBC Two logo to use the clock ident.

The new idents commissioned after 1997 placed less emphasis on the use of the colour viridian and the bell/harp music. Later on, as the Internet began to grow, the URL of BBC's website (www.bbc.co.uk) was included in idents on-screen from January 2000. On 27 September 2018, BBC Two received a rebrand, with the sans-serif '2' symbol being retired after 27 years; a new set of idents featuring a curve motif resembling a '2' were introduced. The last ident from this set, Optics, was aired one minute before the new set of idents were introduced.

Ident list

1991–1997

1997–2001

References

External links

BBC Two: 2015 Idents (whole set with video clips)
Ident Gallery Special Pres 2013

BBC Two
BBC Idents
Television presentation in the United Kingdom